The NFR Open  is an annual championship rodeo event of the Professional Rodeo Cowboys Association (PRCA) held annually in the United States. The event was previously known as the National Circuit Finals Rodeo (NCFR) from 1987 to 2021, before being renamed as the NFR Open in 2022. Qualification for the event comes via winning the season title or winning the average title at the regional circuit finals rodeos in bareback riding, steer wrestling, team roping, saddle bronc riding, tie-down roping, barrel racing, breakaway roping or bull riding. To qualify, a competitor must compete in one of the 12 PRCA regional American circuits (Montana, Mountain States, Wilderness, Columbia River, California, Turquoise, Texas, Prairie, Badlands, Great Lakes, Southeast, and First Frontier) or one of two international circuits; the Mexico Circuit and Canada's Maple Leaf Circuit. 

From 1987 to 2010, the NCFR was held every spring in Pocatello, Idaho. Then from 2011 to 2013, the event took place in Oklahoma City, Oklahoma. The event moved to Guthrie, Oklahoma in 2014. In 2015, the NCFR moved to Kissimmee, Florida. In 2020, due to the COVID-19 pandemic, the NCFR was rescheduled and moved to a different location. It was ultimately held September 10 through 13 at the Stampede Arena in Greeley, Colorado. The event was closed to the public. In 2021, the NCFR returned to Kissimmee, Florida and was held during its normal run in the springtime, but consisted of a limited and socially distanced crowd due to the ongoing pandemic.

In 2022, the National Circuit Finals Rodeo was renamed as the NFR Open and now takes place every July at the Pikes Peak or Bust Rodeo in Colorado Springs, Colorado. 

Competitors go through two longer performances to compete for eight spots for the semi-finals. The semis and the finals are in sudden death format. The top four times and scores will advance to the one go-round final. Whoever has the top score or time in the finals is crowned the PRCA National Circuit Champion for the year.

In 2008, the ProRodeo Hall of Fame in Colorado Springs, Colorado, inducted the National Circuit Finals Rodeo in the Rodeo Committees category.

References

External links
 Official site

Rodeos
ProRodeo Hall of Fame inductees